Emiliano Javier Amor (born 16 May 1995) is an Argentine footballer who plays as a defender for Colo Colo.

Career
Under José Oscar Flores' coaching, Amor debuted for Vélez Sarsfield with 18 years of age in the 2014 Argentine Primera División 2–0 victory against Defensa y Justicia. During Miguel Ángel Russo's coaching era, Amor became a regular starter for Vélez' first team during the first half of the 2015 Argentine Primera División, playing 14 goals and scoring twice.

On 18 January 2018, Amor signed on loan with Major League Soccer side Sporting Kansas City for the 2018 MLS season.

References

External links
Profile at Vélez Sarsfield's official website 

1995 births
Living people
Footballers from Buenos Aires
Argentine footballers
Argentine expatriate footballers
Argentine Primera División players
Major League Soccer players
USL Championship players
Primera Nacional players
Club Atlético Vélez Sarsfield footballers
Sporting Kansas City players
Sporting Kansas City II players
Aldosivi footballers
San Martín de Tucumán footballers
Colo-Colo footballers
Chilean Primera División players
Expatriate footballers in Chile
Argentine expatriate sportspeople in Chile
Association football defenders